Dennis P. Hogan is an American sociologist, currently the Robert E. Turner Distinguished Professor in Population at Brown University, and also a published author. From 1987 to 1995, he was the Distinguished Professor of Sociology and Director of the Population Research Institute, Pennsylvania State University. His highest cited paper is "The impact of social status, family structure, and neighborhood on the fertility of black adolescents" at 1102 times, according to Google Scholar .

Publications
"The transition to adulthood", DP Hogan, NM Astone, Annual Review of Sociology, Vol. 12:109-130, 1986.
"The structure of intergenerational exchanges in American families", Dennis P. Hogan, David J. Eggebeen and Clifford C. Clogg, American Journal of Sociology, 98:6, 1993
"Giving between generations in American families", David J. Eggebeen, Dennis P. Hogan, Human Nature, 1:3, 1990
"The Variable Order of Events in the Life Course", Dennis P. Hogan, American Sociological Review, 43:4, 1978
"Race, kin networks, and assistance to mother-headed families", DP Hogan, LX Hao, WL Parish, Social Forces, 68:3, pages 797-812, 1990

References

External links 
 Dennis P. Hogan, Population Studies & Training Center, Brown University

Living people
American sociologists
Brown University faculty
University of Iowa alumni
Pennsylvania State University
Year of birth missing (living people)